Return at Dawn (French: Retour à l'aube) is a 1938 French drama film starring Danielle Darrieux, and was directed by Henri Decoin, who co-wrote the screenplay with Pierre Wolff, based on a short story by Vicki Baum. The music score is by Paul Misraki. The sets were designed by the art director Serge Piménoff. It was filmed in Zichyújfalu and Budapest, Hungary.

Plot
A stationmaster's wife must go to Budapest to claim an inheritance, but is late for a train and she experiences many adventures during the night.

Cast
 Danielle Darrieux as Anita Ammer  
 Pierre Dux as Karl Ammer  
 Jacques Dumesnil as Dick Farmer aka 'Keith'  
 Pierre Mingand as Osten 
 Raymond Cordy as Pali  
 Samson Fainsilber as L'inspecteur Veber  
 Marcel Delaître as Le commissaire  
 Thérèse Dorny as La directrice de la maison de couture  
 Louis Florencie 
 Léonce Corne as Un ami d'Osten  
 André Numès Fils as Le notaire 
 Jacques Henley as Un ami d'Osten  
 Robert Ozanne as Un voyageur  
 Yvonne Yma
 Marcelle Barry
 Amy Collin
 Albert Brouett as Voyageur à la couronne 
 Marcel Pérès as Le pharmacien 
 Pierre de Ramey as Un ami d'Osten

References

External links

Retour à l'aube at filmsdefrance.com

1938 films
1938 drama films
French black-and-white films
Films directed by Henri Decoin
Films set in Budapest
Films shot in Budapest
Films based on short fiction
French drama films
1930s French-language films
1930s French films